The 2019 East Devon District Council election took place on 2 May 2019 to elect members of East Devon District Council in England. This was on the same day as other local elections. The whole council was elected on new ward boundaries that increased the number of seats from 59 to 60.

Summary

Election result

|-

Ward Results

Axminster

Beer & Branscombe

Broadclyst

Budleigh & Raleigh

Clyst Valley

Coly Valley

Cranbrook

Dunkeswell & Otterhead

Exe Valley

Exmouth Brixington

Exmouth Halsdon

Exmouth Littleham

Exmouth Town

Exmouth Withycombe Raleigh

Feniton

Honiton St Michael's

Honiton St Paul's

Newbridges

Newton Poppleford & Harpford

Ottery St Mary

Seaton

Sidmouth Rural

Sidmouth Sidford

Sidmouth Town

Tale Vale

Trinity

West Hill & Aylesbeare

Whimple & Rockbeare

Woodbury & Lympstone

Yarty

By-elections

Whimple and Rockbeare

Honiton St Michael's

Exe Valley

References

2019 English local elections
May 2019 events in the United Kingdom
East Devon District Council elections
2010s in Devon